Rupeni Fesaitu Varea (born 13 August 1968) is a Rotuman former weightlifter who represented Fiji.

Career
Varea represented Fiji at the 1996 Atlanta Olympic Games. He finished 17th in the 83 kg division.

Varea was selected as the best performer of the Fiji contingent at the 1998 Commonwealth Games in Kuala Lumpur, Malaysia. This followed his fifth overall placing in the 85 kg division ahead of New Zealander James Swann with a total lift of 310 kg.

Fijian rugby union centre Ravai Fatiaki is his second cousin.

References

External links

Olympic weightlifters of Fiji
Rotuman people
Weightlifters at the 1996 Summer Olympics
1968 births
Living people
Place of birth missing (living people)
Fijian male weightlifters
Weightlifters at the 1998 Commonwealth Games
Commonwealth Games competitors for Fiji